is a former Japanese football player.

Playing career
Matsuo was born in Wakayama on September 10, 1979. After graduating from high school, he joined J1 League club Vissel Kobe in 1998. He played many matches as a substitute midfielder in the first season. In 1999, he moved to the Argentine club Gimnasia y Esgrima Jujuy on loan. In April 1999, he returned to Vissel Kobe. However, he could hardly play in the match until 2000. In 2001, he played many matches as mainly left side back. In 2002, he moved to J2 League club Cerezo Osaka on loan. However, he could not play at all in the match. In July 2002, he returned to Vissel Kobe. However, he could hardly play in the match. In August 2004, he moved to newly was promoted to J1 League club, Albirex Niigata on loan. He played many matches as left-back of three backs defense. In 2005, he returned to Vissel Kobe. Although he played many matches as left-back of three backs defense, he could not play at all in the match in late 2005. In 2006, he moved to FC Tokyo. However, he could not play at all in the match for injury. In 2007, he moved to Albirex Niigata. He played as regular left side back. However his opportunity to play decreased in 2009. In 2010, he moved to Shonan Bellmare. However, he could hardly play in the match due to injury. In 2012, he moved to Regional Leagues club FC Osaka. He retired end of 2013 season.

Club statistics

References

External links

1979 births
Living people
Association football people from Wakayama Prefecture
Japanese footballers
J1 League players
J2 League players
Vissel Kobe players
Gimnasia y Esgrima de Jujuy footballers
Cerezo Osaka players
Albirex Niigata players
FC Tokyo players
Shonan Bellmare players
FC Osaka players
Expatriate footballers in Argentina
Association football defenders